André Bord (30 November 1922 in Strasbourg – 13 May 2013) was a French politician. He served as the national Minister of Veteran Affairs from 1972 to 1974 and the President of the Alsace Regional Council from 1973 to 1977.

References

1922 births
2013 deaths
Politicians from Strasbourg
Politicians from Grand Est
Union for the New Republic politicians
Union of Democrats for the Republic politicians
Rally for the Republic politicians
French Ministers of Veterans Affairs
Deputies of the 1st National Assembly of the French Fifth Republic
Deputies of the 2nd National Assembly of the French Fifth Republic
Deputies of the 3rd National Assembly of the French Fifth Republic
Deputies of the 4th National Assembly of the French Fifth Republic
Deputies of the 5th National Assembly of the French Fifth Republic
Deputies of the 6th National Assembly of the French Fifth Republic
Presidents of the Alsace Regional Council
Grand Crosses with Star and Sash of the Order of Merit of the Federal Republic of Germany